Borgtinderne, meaning 'Castle Pinnacles' in the Danish language, is a mountain range in King Christian IX Land, eastern Greenland. Administratively this range is part of the Sermersooq Municipality.

Geography
The Borgtinderne is a long nunatak with high mountains. It is located east of the Ejnar Mikkelsen Range, between the Borggraven Glacier on its eastern and the Kronborg Glacier on its western side. The southern end of the range reaches the coast. The area of the Borgtinderne is uninhabited.

Mountains
The highest point is Borgetinde, a mountain which has a wide reputation among alpinists and which is the easternmost  summit of Greenland and greater North America.
 Borgetinde (3,265 m); highest peak at 
 Tall peak further north (3,197 m) at 
 Peak SW of the tallest (2,909 m) at 
 Northern end peak (2,389 m) at

Climate
Tundra climate prevails in the region. The average annual temperature in the area of the range is -12 °C. The warmest month is July when the average temperature reaches 0 °C and the coldest is February when the temperature sinks to -21 °C.

See also
List of mountain ranges of Greenland
List of mountains in Greenland
List of Nunataks of Greenland
Syenite

References

External links
The Development of Mountaineering in East and North-East Greenland- An Outline History
The Kap Gustav Holm Tertiary Plutonic Centre, East Greenland
Tertiary Magmatism In East Greenland And Hotspot Magmatism Worldwide

Mountain ranges of Greenland
Nunataks of Greenland
Sermersooq